Jeffrey G. Madrick is a journalist, economic policy consultant and analyst. He is editor of Challenge: The Magazine of Economic Affairs, visiting professor of humanities at The Cooper Union, and director of policy research at the Schwartz Center for Economic Policy Analysis, The New School. He was educated at New York University and Harvard University, and was a Shorenstein Fellow at Harvard.

He is a columnist for Harper's Magazine, a regular contributor to The New York Review of Books, and a former economics columnist for The New York Times. He has also contributed to online publications such as the Daily Beast and the Huffington Post.

Madrick is the author of several books, including Taking America and The End of Affluence, both of which were New York Times Notable Books of the Year. Taking America was also chosen by Business Week as one of the ten best books of the year.

His book The Case for Big Government was named a Finalist (runner-up) for the PEN Galbraith General Non-Fiction Award for 2007-2008.

His latest book, Age of Greed: The Triumph of Finance and the Decline of America, 1970 to the Present, is a history of the American economy since 1970, which argues that deregulation of the financial sector allowed the industry to do tremendous damage to the American economy.

He has written for many other publications, including The Boston Review, The Washington Post, The Los Angeles Times, Institutional Investor, The Nation, American Prospect, The Boston Globe, Newsday, and the business, op-ed, and magazine sections of The New York Times. He has appeared on Charlie Rose, The NewsHour with Jim Lehrer, NOW With Bill Moyers, Frontline, CNN, CNBC, CBS, and NPR. He was formerly finance editor of Business Week Magazine and an NBC News reporter and commentator. His awards include an Emmy and a Page One Award.

He has served as a policy consultant for Sen. Edward M. Kennedy and other U.S. legislators.

Bibliography

Books

 Taking America: How We Got from the First Hostile Takeover to Megamergers, Corporate Raiding, and Scandal Beard Books, 2003. 
 The Case for Big Government. Princeton, N.J.: Princeton University Press, 2009.  
 Age of Greed: The Triumph of Finance and the Decline of America, 1970 to the Present. New York: Alfred A. Knopf, 2011. 
 Seven Bad Ideas: How Mainstream Economists Have Damaged America and the World. New York: Alfred A. Knopf, 2014.  
 Invisible Americans: The Tragic Cost of Child Poverty. New York: Alfred A. Knopf, 2020.

Essays and reporting

References

External links

Bibliography at the New York Review of Books
No New Taxes: The Case for Big Government by Jeff Madrick in the Boston Review, Jan/Feb 2009
Review of "The Case for Big Government" in the Mises Review, Spring 2009
Review of "The Case for Big Government" in the New York Review of Books, Mar 12 2009
Review of "The Case for Big Government" in the New York Times, Jan 18 2009
Critics:Executive pay cuts a sop to taxpayers, NPR.com, Oct 23, 2009.

21st-century American economists
American male journalists
American political writers
Harvard University alumni
New York University alumni
Living people
Year of birth missing (living people)